Like Mother Like Daughter may refer to:

 Like Mother, Like Daughter, a gift book of the comic strip Cathy
 Like Mother, Like Daughter (But in a Good Way), an omnibus book featuring novellas by Jennifer Greene and Peggy Webb
 McCloud: Like Mother, Like Daughter, a novel series by Marie Ferrarella

Television 
 "Like Mother, Like Daughter" (Gilmore Girls), an episode of Gilmore Girls
 "Like Mother, Like Daughter", an episode of the reality series Dallas Divas & Daughters
 "Like Mother, Like Daughter", an episode of the reality series Living Lohan
 "Like Mother, Like Daughter", an episode of the situation comedy series Maude
 "Like Mother, Like Daughter", an episode of the situation comedy series The Facts of Life
 "Like Mother, Like Daughter", an episode of the situation comedy series Happy Days
 "Like Mother, Like Daughter, Like Wow", an episode of the situation comedy series The Many Loves of Dobie Gillis
 "Like Mother, Like Daughter, Like Supermodel", an episode of the teenager drama series Make It or Break It

See also 
 Like Father Like Son (disambiguation)
 Like Father Like Daughter (disambiguation)